Sudhindranath Dutta (30 October 1901 – 25 June 1960) was an Indian poet, essayist, journalist and critic. Sudhindranath is one of the most notable poets after the Tagore-era in Bengali literature.

Education
Sudhindranath Dutt went to the Theosophical High School in Varanasi between 1914 and 1917, and later attended the Oriental Seminary in Kolkata. Later he graduated from the Scottish Church College. He later studied law at the Law College (1922–1924), while also simultaneously preparing for his finals for an MA in English literature from the University of Calcutta. However, he did not complete a degree (MA or a law degree) in either subject.

Career
Born to the renowned lawyer Hirendranath Dutta, and Indumati Vasu Mallik, sister of Raja Subodh Chandra Vasu Mallik, Sudhindranath became an apprentice under his father's supervision. He did not obtain a formal law degree. He married Chhabi Basu in 1924.

He started publishing Parichay, a literary magazine which heralded his philosophy, in 1931 and carried on with the job till 1943, when he left following ideological battle with his associates, but supplied funds nevertheless. He was also associated with Sabujpatra, another noted literary magazine of the era, which was edited by eminent story-writer of the era, Pramatha Chaudhury. 

He worked also as a journalist for The Statesman from 1945 to 1949. He was also associated with the daily The Forward, then edited by Netaji Subhas Chandra Bose, as the organ of All India Forward Bloc.
He had also worked for several companies such as Light of Asia Insurance Company from 1930 to 1933, ARP from 1942 to 1945, DVC from 1949 to 1954, and Institute of Public Opinion from 1954 to 1956.

He was a part-time lecturer of Comparative Literature in Jadavpur University from 1956 to 1957. In 1957, he left for his final foreign trip and toured Japan and Europe before moving to United States of America to join University of Chicago to write his autobiography in English. However he left the lucrative job midway and returned home to rejoin Jadavpur University to resume his classes of Comparative Literature, which he continued till his death.

Trivia
Sudhindranath Dutta believed that hard work is what is needed for creating art, and the embattled nature of his poetry contrasted with that of the romantic poetry of Jibanananda Das. When Jibanananda Das's poetry notebooks were printed, Dutt commented after seeing the great number of corrections and deletions in the notebooks "Oh, then the natural poets are also unnatural poets, like me!"

Perhaps his most famous line is the widely quoted one from his poem Utpakhi (The ostrich):

Literary analysis : In the words of Buddhadev Bose 

• From An Acre of Green Grass
The majority of our modern poets have welcomed the prose poem, but two have stood firmly against it, both in theory and practice, Sudhindranath Dutta and Annadasankar Ray. It is well worth saying here that the two, in two different worlds, are great artificers in prose: Sudhindranath's critical essays are an illumination, and Annadasankar, in his fiction and belles-lettres, is a writer of beautiful prose. He began as ardently in verse as in prose, but turned more and more to the sumptuousness of the latter, and for some years wrote no verse, or all but none. His recent appearance in the sphere of limericks, clerihews and doggerels is a joyful event: for he is master of light verse, and light verse is not necessarily slight. Annadasankar has effected that marriage between poetry and wit which is at once so happy and rare; he has the secret of turning topical comments to an art, and his fun ranges from the 'People's War' to mosquito-bites. That rippling, dancing lightness which marks his prose also animates all the verse he has written, and has led him to rediscover the chhada, the measure of our old ballads and nursery rhymes.

Sudhindranath Dutta is altogether different. There is nothing in him that is happy or light or sparkling; all is dark, darkly and bitterly passionate. There is a profound unity in all his poems; each is a part of a larger whole, and that whole larger than the sum of his poems. Poem after poem, he is working on a theme, expounding and elaborating it, repeating and correcting himself. His first mature work, Orchestra, is in some way a unique book in our language. It is a book of love poems, not the mystical love of the Vaishnavas, nor the idyllic love of Rabindranath's Ksanika, but a blind, violent and terrible love, born and bound in the body, without relief, release or hope of release. The poems have an unprecedented setting; for the lover is blase' and past his prime, and the mistress a young foreigner whose country is the place of action. The moment of time is when the lovers have been separated -- irrevocably; and the whole drama, seen and revealed through memory, is charged with an anguish and a fury that the poet strains every nerve to hold in leash. It is characteristic, and also a measure, of Sudhindranath's powers that, in these poems, he has combined the passionateness of youth with the contemplation of maturity. Separation, in Indian poetry, is traditionally sweet and serene, and even a channel of grace; but to this poet, separation is infernal and serenity death. yet this has not made of him an youthful idolater of the flesh; his is a mind that can see the clay in the idol, though not the symbol in the clay; a mind brave and self-reliant, desperately holding on to the ceremony of the intellect when all his world appears to be doomed. Orchestra is breathless with pain, the pain of memory which the poet can neither bear nor bear to think that time will deaden; it is 'heavy with the burden of Fate', for the present is dead and the future lightless, the only reality being the past, red with the flames of memory. the poems have caught the glow: they are as living as the love they describe.

Sudhindranath Dutta appeared on the literary scene rather late in life. His equipment was enviable, his discipline exemplary. His splendid poems were not an immediate 'success' -- for it is not easy to fall in love with them at first sight -- and the recognition he deserves has not yet come to him. He, too, has been blamed for obscurity, and mentioned in the same breath with Bishnu Dey, though the two have little in common. Sudhindranath, far from being obscure, is a model of lucidity, in as much as he does his best to give his verse a prose-like regularity. He is ratiocinative, and delights in pursuing an argument from point to point, and from stanza to stanza, right to its logical conclusion. Indeed, I should rather find fault with him for being, on occasions, too logical, too conclusive, and making a poem, with an array of `although's, `therefore's and `yet's, almost like an Euclidean proposition. The only difficulty we are likely to encounter in him is a highly Sanskritic vocabulary, and here it is not the words that so much trouble us as their connotations, for he often uses some word in its original Sanskrit sense, a sense lost to Bengali, or coins new forms from old, well-known roots, and that for a very good reason. His aim being to charge words with maximum meaning and reduce their number, he is not to be blamed if the current Bengali vocabulary does not suffice him. On the contrary, he is to be praised for the directness he has brought to our language, for the number of vital words and compounds he has coined, for his having made us newly and differently aware of the riches of Sanskrit, and lastly, for his effective harmonization of the commonest idioms and a classical diction, of dramatic declamation and meandering soliloquy.

Rabindranath once wrote of him in a letter :

"I know Sudhindra Datta's poetry from its beginning, and have grown rather partial to it. One reason for this is that it has taken much of its shape, and that quite unhesitantly, from my work. Yet its nature is entirely his own. His individuality, free from arrogance, has never neglected to make acknowledgements to the proper sources. This courage comes from power. "

The above is aptly said, for Sudhindranath gleans freely from Tagorean harvests, not, like Bishnu Dey, archly, self-consciously or with implied sarcasm, but in a straightforward manner, never trying to conceal what is true for him and each of his contemporaries, that Rabindranath lives in him. He does not have to employ any startling or oblique means to show that he is unlike Rabindranath; often has he allowed Tagorean utterances to be heard through his voice, and yet his difference is throughout irresistible; his individuality, uniformly and totally beyond question.

 •Exctract from Modern Bengali 
   Prose :

A singular figure in our recent speculative prose is Sudhindranath Datta, the poet, Svagata (the title, meaning 'Soliloquies', is at once a challenge and a confession), a collection of essays in literary criticism and his only prose book so far, gives the impression that the author, aware like the others of the inequality of the spirit and the medium, the subject-matter and the language, refused, unlike the others, to adopt any evasive, though practically effective strategy, but thought out each sentence completely in English, translating it, almost word for word, into a rich and fabulous Bengali. I say fabulous, for this apparently impossible task he could achieve only by sacrificing lucidity and all manner of 'surface' attraction, by bewildering the reader with Sanskrit words unheard in Bengali, technical terms of Hindu metaphysics, old words in new senses and, finally, words of his own coinage. There is not the least deviation or compromise; the sentences, strained to the utmost for attaining a directness and a precision not natural to Bengali, are in structure as involved and elaborate a they would be in English, though necessarily heavier. But what matter if they grow heavier still? Sudhindranath is out to have all his say: he does not leave out a subject, or a thought, nor even a slight modification of it because it 'just won't go' in Bengali, a form of compromise we can discern in both Pramatha Chaudhuri and Annadasankar.

This prose, produced cerebrally with almost a foreigner's fastidiousness might, in effect, appear to be the work of a highly gifted European who has taken the trouble of studying first Sanskrit and then Bengali, and the additional trouble of speaking out his mind on European and Bengali literatures in the comparatively insufficient language of the latter. But this is only appearance, for in reality Sudhindranath, as in his verse, blends a rigidly Sanskrit diction with common spoken idioms, some of which cannot even be suggested in English. This blending vitalizes his work but by no means relaxes the tension of thought. What makes his prose look 'foreign' is that, unlike his verse, it is untraditional; neither Pramatha Chaudhuri whom he ardently admires, nor Rabindranath whom, this side idolatry, he worships, is its moulder or starting point, or if so, he has concealed the fact so well as to make a complete denial. He gives us a new prose, or a new mode of prose, sombre, ponderous, of a compactness not known before, an enhancer, we might say, not only of the potency of our language, but also our own capacity for abstract thinking. For language modifies thought as much as thought organizes language; the more words we have, the more variously we learn to use them, the better we can think. Bengali as I have already implied, is in its present stage practically debarred from certain abstract subjects; Sudhindranath, at least, has shown a way. It is a way he has found, but not traversed; he has worked hard to forge new implements but not long enough to devise new means. Here and there in his prose we come upon sparks to ignite our mind, exquisite, memorable, quotable phrases and sentences; yet on the whole he makes us wrestle too much, sends us too often to the voluminous dictionaries, confounds us too frequently with an almost mathematical compression; and although the few who have submitted themselves to the hardship of unravelling him have been amply repaid, the great majority of readers have not been disposed to follow suit. Some other writer or writers, it is likely, will, in the near future, use him as a base, modify, extend and adapt this new mode so as to combine its advantages with the primary quality of ease which Sudhindranath admires but lacks. He would have done it himself if, like Atulchandra Gupta, he had not practically abandoned writing.

Works

Collected poetry
 Tanvi(1930), M..Sarkar &Sons
 Orchestra(1935), Bharati Bhavan
 Krandashee(1937), Bharati Bhavan
 Uttar Falgunee (1940), Parichay Press
 Sangbarto (1953) Signet Press
 Pratiddhani (1954) Signet Press
 Dashamee (1956) Signet Press.

Collected essays
 Svagato , Bharati Bhavan

Title page of the first edition of Swagata 

 Svagato (1957) New changed version from Signet Press
 Kulay O Kaalpurush, (1957), Signet Press.

References

Bengali male poets
Oriental Seminary alumni
Scottish Church College alumni
University of Calcutta alumni
1960 deaths
1901 births
20th-century Indian poets
Indian male poets
Poets from Uttar Pradesh
20th-century Indian male writers
 Writers from Kolkata